The Terrorism Act may refer to legislation in various countries:

South Africa
Terrorism Act No 83 of 1967

United Kingdom
 Prevention of Terrorism Act (Northern Ireland), laws passed between 1974 and 1989 to deal with terrorism in Northern Ireland
 Terrorism Act 2000
 Anti-terrorism, Crime and Security Act 2001
 Prevention of Terrorism Act 2005
 Terrorism Act 2006
 Terrorism (Northern Ireland) Act 2006

See also 
Anti-terrorism legislation 
:Category:Terrorism laws